Žarko Đurišić (born March 31, 1961), also credited as Zarko Durisic, is a Montenegrin-born Slovenian basketball scout, former player, and former coach who is currently the Director of international player personnel for the Minnesota Timberwolves of the National Basketball Association (NBA).

Playing career 
Đurišić started his basketball career playing with the youth teams of Budućnost. In 1978, at age of 17, he moved to Crvena zvezda of the Yugoslav Federal League. He played two seasons there, until 1980. Over 44 regular season games, he averaged 2.5 point per game.

In 1980, Đurišić moved to the United States to play college basketball at Wichita State University where his four seasons in the NCAA Division I with the Shockers were very successful. Arriving to Wichita together with compatriot Zoran Radović, Đurišić joined the squad featuring future NBA players Cliff Levingston, Antoine Carr, Xavier McDaniel and Ozell Jones as the sixth-seeded Wichita State team came within one game of making it to the Final Four, losing the Midwest regional final to first regional seed Louisiana State University.

After finishing college career he went back to the Yugoslav League where he played for Budućnost and Smelt Olimpija. With Olimpija he also played Premier A Slovenian League after 1992.

National team career

Yugoslavia national team 
Đurišić was a member of the Yugoslavia national cadet team that won the silver medal at the 1977 European Championship for Cadets. Over three tournament games, he averaged 4.7 points per game. He also was a member of the Yugoslavia national junior team that participated at the 1979 World Championship for Juniors and also won the silver medal at the 1980 European Championship for Juniors.

Slovenia national team 
Đurišić was a member of the Slovenia national team that participated at the EuroBasket 1993. Over three tournament games, he averaged 4.7 points per game. Slovenia took 14th place at the tournament. He played 27 games for the national team.

Post-playing career 
Đurišić briefly coached Smelt Olimpija during the 1995–96 season. He took over the team's coaching reigns from Zmago Sagadin in January 2016, leading them to the Slovenian League title at the end of the season.

Since summer 1996, Đurišić has been affiliated with the Minnesota Timberwolves organization where he heads up the team's international scouting efforts. Positions he previously held with the Wolves include director of college and international player personnel, director of player personnel, and head scout.

Personal life 
Đurišić and his wife, Tatjana, have two daughters: Jelena and Aleksandra. Daughter Jelena (born 1989 in Belgrade) is a Slovenian former tennis player.

Career achievements and awards
Player
 European Cup winner: 1 (with Smelt Olimpija: 1993–94) 
 Premier A Slovenian League champion: 4 (with Smelt Olimpija: 1991–92, 1992–93, 1993–94, 1994–95) 
 Yugoslav Cup winner: 4 (with Smelt Olimpija: 1992, 1993, 1994, 1995) 

Coach
 Premier A Slovenian League champion: 1 (with Smelt Olimpija: 1995–96)

References

1961 births
Living people
KK Budućnost players
KK Crvena zvezda players
KK Olimpija players
KK Olimpija coaches
Minnesota Timberwolves scouts
Minnesota Timberwolves executives
Montenegrin expatriate basketball people in Serbia
Montenegrin expatriate basketball people in the United States
Montenegrin men's basketball players
Montenegrin basketball scouts
National Basketball Association scouts from Europe
Serbian expatriate basketball people in the United States
Serbs of Montenegro
Slovenian basketball coaches
Slovenian basketball scouts
Slovenian people of Serbian descent
Slovenian people of Montenegrin descent
Slovenian expatriate basketball people in Serbia
Slovenian expatriate basketball people in the United States
Slovenian men's basketball players
Sportspeople from Podgorica
Wichita State Shockers men's basketball players
Yugoslav men's basketball players
Centers (basketball)